Sir Henry Harris  (28 January 1925 – 31 October 2014) was an Australian professor of medicine at the University of Oxford who led pioneering work on cancer and human genetics in the 2000s.

Early life and education
Harris was born in 1925 to a Jewish family in the Soviet Union. In 1929, his family emigrated to Australia. Harris studied at Sydney Boys High School from 1937 to 1941. In 1941, he first read modern languages, but was subsequently attracted to medicine through his literary interests. He studied medicine at the Royal Prince Alfred Hospital and began a career in medical research rather than in clinical practice.

Career
In the early 1950s, Harris moved to England to study at the Sir William Dunn School of Pathology in Oxford under Howard Florey. He completed his DPhil in 1954 and settled down to a career of academic research. In 1960, he was appointed the head of the new department of cell biology at the John Innes Institute, and, in 1964, he succeeded Florey as head of the Dunn School. In 1979, he was appointed as Oxford's Regius Professor of Medicine, succeeding Richard Doll.

Harris's research interests were primarily focused on cancer cells and their differences from normal cells. He later studied the possibility of genetic modification of human cell lines with the material of other species to increase the range of genetic markers. Harris and his colleagues developed some of the basic techniques for investigating and measuring genes along the human chromosome.

In 1965, he reported his observation that most nuclear RNA was non-coding, a view that was not widely accepted until years later. In 1969, Harris showed that when malignant cancer cells were fused with normal fibroblasts, the resulting hybrids were not malignant, thus demonstrating the existence of genes that could suppress malignancy. Work on these tumour suppressor genes has become a worldwide industry.

In 1983, Harris was elected to the Australian Academy of Science as a Corresponding Fellow. In 1993, he was knighted.

Much of Harris's work has been supported by Cancer Research UK (formerly the Cancer Research Campaign).

He died on 31 October 2014, aged 89.

Works

Published books
 
 

 (The Romanes Lecture for 1993).

References

External links
 Henry Harris in the Oxford Brookes Medical Video Archive
History of the William Dunn School of Pathology in Oxford
Henry Harris archive collection – Wellcome Library finding aid

1925 births
2014 deaths
Soviet emigrants to Australia
Australian emigrants to the United Kingdom
British biologists
British Jews
British medical researchers
Fellows of Lincoln College, Oxford
Fellows of the Royal Society
Australian Knights Bachelor
People educated at Sydney Boys High School
Royal Medal winners
Regius Professors of Medicine (University of Oxford)
Sydney Medical School alumni
University of Sydney alumni
Fellows of the Australian Academy of Science
Alumni of Lincoln College, Oxford
Scientists from Sydney
British people of Russian-Jewish descent
Australian people of Russian-Jewish descent